Shelter Cove may refer to:

Shelter Cove (Antarctica)
Shelter Cove, California, in Humboldt County, U.S.
Shelter Cove Airport
Shelter Cove, Pacifica, California, in San Mateo County, U.S.